The Caretaker Government of Ne Win was formed in 1958 after Ne Win, then Chief of Staff, took over state power from U Nu, then Prime Minister. This is the first caretaker government in Burmese history. After the 1960 election, power was restored to U Nu.

History
The political situation became chaotic after the ruling Anti-Fascist People's Freedom League (AFPFL) split in April 1958 as a clean AFPFL and stable AFPFL party. On the morning of September 26 1958, Colonel Aung Gyi, Brigadier General Tin Pe,  Colonel Maung Maung from the Tatmadaw visited PM U Nu's house. In the evening, the executive meeting of the ruling AFPFL and the current cabinet ministers meetings were held consecutively. At that time, General Ne Win paid a short visit. The Cabinet meeting decided to nominate General Ne Win as the Prime Minister at a parliamentary session on 28 September. Incumbent Prime Minister U Nu has written to General Ne Win to form a caretaker government to handle the conditions. U Nu told Ne Win to hold general election again within 6 months (April 1959).

Then, in October 1958, a caretaker government was formed and sworn in at the Presidential Palace in Rangoon. Parliaments were not dissolved. This government is made up of a small portion of the military, mostly civilian ministers and local leaders. Newspapers reported that U Nu resigned and handed over power to General Ne Win, but some described it as a coup.

On 29 April 1959, during the caretaker government, 34 Shan Saopha relinquished power. General Election was held in February 1960 and U Nu won the election. However, two years later, in March 1962, the military seized power.

Cabinet

References 

Cabinet of Myanmar
1958 establishments in Burma
Cabinets established in 1958
Caretaker governments